Coeloptera vulpina is a species of moth of the family Tortricidae. It is found in Australia, where it has been recorded from New South Wales and Queensland.

The wingspan is about 12 mm. The forewings are fuscous, with a dull purplish gloss, suffused (except near the base) with reddish brown. The hindwings are whitish, strigulated (finely streaked) with whitish grey.

References

Archipini
Moths described in 1916
Moths of Australia
Taxa named by Alfred Jefferis Turner